Rathilayam is a 1983 Indian Malayalam film, directed by P. Chandrakumar and produced by Madhu. The film stars Madhu, Silk Smitha and Captain Raju in the lead roles. The film has musical score by A. T. Ummer and M. G. Radhakrishnan.

Cast
Madhu as Mammad Kutti
Srividya as Nabeesa
Captain Raju as Appukuttan
Silk Smitha as Devikutty
M. G. Soman as Somen Thiruvalla
Sankaradi as Const. Vasu Pilla
Menaka as Makkotty
Rajkumar as Rajan
G. K. Pillai as Menon
Shanavas as Shanker
Soorya as Sarasamma
Mala Aravindan as Const. Lonappan
Jagathy Sreekumar
Bheeman Raghu

Soundtrack
The music was composed by A. T. Ummer and M. G. Radhakrishnan and the lyrics were written by Poovachal Khader.

References

External links
 

1983 films
1980s Malayalam-language films
Films directed by P. Chandrakumar